is a railway station on the Nishikigawa Seiryū Line in Yamaguchi Prefecture, Japan. It is operated by the Nishikigawa Railway, a third-sector railway company.

History

Due to the lack of any roads or footpaths leading to the station, Seiryu Miharashi can only be reached by train. Cost of the construction was approximately 112 million yen. It was built as a viewing platform and is facing the Nishiki River.

The station will only be served by special trains.

Adjacent stations

See also
 List of railway stations in Japan

References

External links
  

Railway stations in Japan opened in 2019
Railway stations in Yamaguchi Prefecture
Railway stations accessible only by rail